Courtney King-Dye (born November 20, 1977) is an American equestrian. She competed in two events at the 2008 Summer Olympics.

Career 
King-Dye became a student of Olympic equestrian Lendon Gray at age 17. She graduated from Columbia University in 2004.

She competed in the 2008 Summer Olympics, originally placing 13th in the individual competition and fourth in the team event. King-Dye and the U.S. dressage team were however disqualified after her horse tested positive for felbinac.

King-Dye had a training accident in March 2010, suffering a traumatic brain injury and falling into a four-week-long coma. She had to re-learn walking and speaking. King-Dye won the FEI Against All Odds Award in 2012.

After recovering, King-Dye became an advocate for the use of helmets in dressage. In 2014 she received the Charles Owen Equestrian Role Model Award for this activist work.

Personal life 
King-Dye is married to Jason Dye; they have two daughters, born in 2014 and 2016.

References

External links 
 
 
 

1977 births
Living people
American female equestrians
American dressage riders
Olympic equestrians of the United States
Equestrians at the 2008 Summer Olympics
Sportspeople from Saginaw, Michigan
Columbia University School of General Studies alumni
21st-century American women